The Gunt (Ghund or Аличур Alichur, historically in English also Ghund) is a river in the south of Tajikistan, north of the Shughnon Range. Its source, Lake Yashilkul, is situated at the edge of the Alichur Pamir, a high plateau or pamir at an elevation of 3720m. The city of Khorog is located at the confluence of the Gunt with the Panj (one of the source rivers of the Amu Darya, forming the border between Tajikistan and Afghanistan). See Gorno-Badakhshan Autonomous Region for surrounding area.

The Gunt, and its tributary Shakhdara, power the Pamir I power plant.  River flow is very seasonal, low in winter, but high in July and August due to water from melting snow. Its width varies from 10 to 50 meters and it is up to 1.5 meters deep. Due to the mountainous terrain, the rivercourse is very fast, over 2 m/s at times. Its bed is rocky, and the banks are steep and precipitous. Often the stream occupies the whole river valley, but sometimes it divides into several courses.

References

External links
Tajikistan Development Gateway (Rivers)
Debris flows (photographs)
Upper Tokharistan (Pamir)
Map of Gunt
Kayaking and White Water Rafting

Rivers of Tajikistan
Gorno-Badakhshan Autonomous Region